Vlado Papić (born 21 September 1968) is a Croatian retired footballer.

Club career
He spent the majority of his career in the German leagues.

References

1968 births
Living people
Association football forwards
Yugoslav footballers
Croatian footballers
HNK Hajduk Split players
GNK Dinamo Zagreb players
NK Zagreb players
MSV Duisburg players
FC Gütersloh 2000 players
SV Eintracht Trier 05 players
1. FC Magdeburg players
SSV Jahn Regensburg players
FC Augsburg players
Yugoslav First League players
2. Bundesliga players
Regionalliga players
NOFV-Oberliga players
Croatian expatriate footballers
Expatriate footballers in Germany
Croatian expatriate sportspeople in Germany